Walter Sendzik (born February 28, 1972) is a Canadian politician who served as the mayor of St. Catharines from 2014 to 2022. As mayor, he sat on Niagara Regional Council. Sendzik did not run for a third term in the 2022 Niagara Region municipal elections, and was succeeded as mayor by Mat Siscoe.

Career 
Prior to being elected, Sendzik was the general manager of the Greater Niagara Chamber of Commerce. He had been with the Chamber of Commerce for seven years. Prior to this, he founded Vines Publishing, a publishing company specializing in wine and travel, including Vines magazine. He sold the company in 2005. He also served as president of the Niagara Wine Festival. He holds a B.A. from Wilfrid Laurier University and a master's degree from McGill University.

Sendzik was first elected as mayor in 2014 on a platform of youth retention, employment diversification, and attracting well paying jobs. The position was an open one with the previous mayor, Brian McMullan retiring. Sendzik defeated future NDP MPP Jeff Burch, winning 40% of the vote to Burch's 35%. In his first term as mayor, the city prepared for the construction of a 19-storey condominium building, the first of its kind in the city, part of the city's transition into both a bedroom community and the "urban centre" of the Niagara Region. 

He was re-elected in 2018 running on a record of economic development and investing in infrastructure. He was re-elected, winning 72% of the vote. After being re-elected, one issue Sendzik had to deal with were the layoffs at General Motors, one of the largest private sector employers in the city. Also during his second term, St. Catharines experienced a housing boom after increased GO Train connections to the Greater Toronto Area.

References

Mayors of St. Catharines
Living people
1972 births
Canadian book publishers (people)
Canadian magazine publishers (people)
Writers from Ontario
Wilfrid Laurier University alumni
McGill University alumni